MIEM may refer to:

 Member of the Institute of Emergency Management
 Moscow Institute of Electronics and Mathematics